Kelham Road is a cricket ground in Newark-on-Trent, Nottinghamshire.  The first recorded match on the ground was in 1849, when the Newark played an All-England Eleven.  In 1856, the ground hosted a its only first-class match when Nottinghamshire played an All-England Eleven.  The ground is the home of Newark Ransome & Marles Cricket Club.

References

External links
Kelham Road on CricketArchive
Kelham Road on Cricinfo

Cricket grounds in Nottinghamshire
Sports venues completed in 1849
1849 establishments in England
Newark-on-Trent